is a professional Japanese baseball player. He plays infielder for the Tokyo Yakult Swallows.

External links

 NPB.com

1983 births
Living people
Baseball people from Kobe
Waseda University alumni
Japanese baseball players
Nippon Professional Baseball infielders
Tokyo Yakult Swallows players